Local elections were held in Cape Verde on 21 March 2004. The Movement for Democracy (MpD) won in the municipalities of Boa Vista, Paul, Porto Novo, São Domingos and Tarrafal, the MpD-affiliated Ribeira Grande Democratic Group (GDRG) won in Ribeira Grande, while the African Party for the Independence of Cape Verde (PAICV) won in the municipalities of Mosteiros, Praia the capital, Santa Catarina do Fogo and São Filipe.

Results

References

External links
2004 municipal elections result

2004 in Cape Verde
2004
2004 elections in Africa
March 2004 events in Africa